Drumline is a 2002 American coming-of-age teen comedy-drama film directed by Charles Stone III. The screenplay, which was inspired by the Southwest Dekalb High School Drumline, was written by Tina Gordon Chism and Shawn Schepps. The film follows a young drummer from New York, played by Nick Cannon, who enters the fictional Atlanta A&T University and bumps heads with the leader of his new school's drum section. Zoe Saldaña, Leonard Roberts and Orlando Jones also co-star.

The film received generally positive reviews from critics, with most of them praising the musical bands' overall performances. It was a success at the box office, earning over $56 million in the U.S., and almost $1.2 million in foreign markets.

A direct sequel Drumline: A New Beat, premiered on VH1 on October 27, 2014. Cannon reprises his role as Devon, albeit as a supporting character rather than the protagonist.

Plot
The story revolves around Devon Miles, a teen who has just graduated from high school in New York City. Upon graduating, Devon heads to Atlanta, Georgia to attend Atlanta A&T University, a historically black college that takes enormous pride in its marching band. En route to A&T, Devon befriends fellow band mates Charles, Jayson, and Ernest. Devon was personally invited to attend on a full scholarship by Dr. Lee, head of the band, for his prodigious talents. The A&T band separates itself from its competitors by requiring all members to read music, by focusing on various styles of music rather than what is currently popular on the radio, and by dedication to the teamwork emphasized "one band, one sound" concept. Preseason band camp is physically and mentally challenging, designed to push members past what they previously thought were their limits. At the end of preseason, the musicians audition for spots on the field, and Devon is the only freshman to make P1, the highest-level player. While going through this rigorous process, Devon also finds time to romance an upperclassman dancer, Laila.

College life starts well for Devon, as he has a girlfriend and a spot on the field. Things begin to sour when Sean, Devon's percussion leader, begins to grow weary of his cocky attitude. Sean later challenges Devon to take a solo in his first game, believing the freshman will panic and be embarrassed in front of everyone. Sean is shocked and subsequently humiliated when Devon takes the solo, upsetting Dr. Lee. As punishment, Dr. Lee orders Sean to clean the drums. This sets up some tension in the drumline which is exacerbated when Dr. Lee is told by President Wagner, the school's president, to change his focus from music to entertainment, otherwise he could potentially lose his funding. Lee does not want to give Devon more playing time because of his lack of respect and selfish attitude. Upon learning he lied on his college application about knowing how to read music, Devon is demoted to P4 by Dr. Lee until he learns, then later put back on P1 when Wagner pressures Dr. Lee to do so. However, after inflaming a melee with a visiting band at A&T's homecoming game after Devon plays on an opposing band member's drum (a serious insult in drumline mythos), Devon is expelled from the band by Dr. Lee. The fight also strains his relationship with Laila, as she is embarrassed to introduce him to her parents, who attended the game.

Devon contacts A&T's rival school Morris Brown College, to discuss playing for their band next season. Mr. Wade, Brown's band leader, says that Devon does not need to know how to read music and will likely get a full scholarship and a good position on the drumline. When Wade wants to know what Dr. Lee is planning for the BET Big Southern Classic (a large competition of college bands), Devon realizes Mr. Wade was merely trying to use him to steal A&T's performance plans, and that his heart and honor are still with the A&T band. Disgusted with both Mr. Wade and himself, he rejects the scholarship offer from the rival band and returns to A&T.

Though Devon is still not playing for the band, he refuses to give up his drumming. After receiving cassette tapes from his estranged father, Ray, Devon gets inspiration for new drum arrangements. As Devon goes to present these ideas to the band, he and Sean have a final confrontation that clears the air and they begin to work together. The two present their idea for an entrance cadence to Dr. Lee who decides to use them for the Classic. Devon helps the band prepare for the Classic and patches up his relationship with Laila. In appreciation for all his help getting the band ready for the Classic and impressed with Devon's maturing and growth, Dr. Lee tells Devon he can return to the band the following school year.

At the Classic, the bands are shown performing a mixture of popular songs. Morris Brown's band even gets rapper Petey Pablo to perform during their routine. A&T is not fazed by this and performs their mix of retro and current sounds. A tie results in the Morris Brown and A&T drumlines facing off against each other. Dr. Lee allows Devon to play for this face-off, showing his faith in Devon's improved character and in thanks for all the hard work he has done in getting the band ready for the Classic. Morris Brown goes first and A&T responds. Morris Brown's second cadence includes their snares moving forward and playing on the A&T drums (the same move that incited the fight at A&T's homecoming game), then throwing down their sticks. The A&T line manages to hold their composure in the face of the insult. They play their cadence and, in the middle, throw down their sticks, mimicking the Morris Brown actions, but then the entire line pulls out another set of sticks and continues playing. They end their routine in the faces of the Morris Brown drumline, but instead of playing on their drums, the line all drop their sticks onto the other drumline's drums. The judges award the win to A&T.

Cast

Release

Home media
The film was released on VHS and in fullscreen and widescreen editions on DVD April 19, 2003. A "special edition" DVD version of the film was later released on December 6, 2011. The film was released in the Blu-ray format on January 27, 2009.

Critical reception
On Rotten Tomatoes, the film has an approval rating of 82% based on reviews from 84 critics. The site's consensus states: "Essentially a sports movie with drums, the energetic Drumline somehow manages to make the familiar seem fresh." It is tied for the #98 spot on the site's list of 100 Best Films of 2002. At Metacritic, the film has averaged a 63 out of 100 rating from critics, based on 28 reviews. Audiences polled by CinemaScore gave the film a rare "A+" grade.

At Yahoo! Movies, the film has been given a B average based on 14 reviews from critics, and a B− by over 30,000 users. The film was given 3½ stars at Allmovie, where reviewer Josh Ralske gave positive note to the performances of the main cast and Stone's direction but still called the plot "formulaic."

Natasha Grant at BlackFilm.com called the movie "irresistible," "wonderfully crafted," and "fascinating." For the Chicago Sun-Times, Roger Ebert gave the film 3 out of 4 stars, giving the film credit as being "entertaining" and "admirable." At the Los Angeles Times, Kenneth Turan believed the film to be entertaining, although he states that the plot is "way-familiar." Writing for The New York Times, A. O. Scott, while feeling the movie had a "skimpy, hectic plot," still believed the film to be "bouncy, boisterous and charming," and the play of the marching bands to be "downright thrilling." Mike Clark at USA Today awarded the film two and a half of four stars, feeling the film to be conventional but competent, and giving particular positive note to J. Anthony Brown, Orlando Jones, and Leonard Roberts performances. One of the films negative reviews came courtesy of David Levine at FilmCritic.com. Giving the film 2.5 out of 5 stars, Levine called the screenplay "standard formula" and "predictable," and went on to say that it was unfunny as well as uninspiring. He said he was impressed by the precision and artistry of the marching bands.

Awards and nominations

Soundtrack

The film's soundtrack was also executive produced by Dallas Austin. Released December 10, 2002, it reached the number 61 spot on Billboard's Top R&B/Hip-Hop Albums chart, number 10 on the Top Soundtracks list, and peaked at 133 on The Billboard 200 in 2003. The tracks "I Want a Girl Like You," "Blowin' Me Up (With Her Love)," and "Club Banger" were all released as singles, with JC Chasez' "Blowin' Me Up..." obtaining the highest level of success, reaching the number 24 spot on the Canadian Singles Chart, number 17 on the Top 40 Tracks chart, and number 14 on the Top 40 Mainstream chart.

(*): Indicates songs were released as singles

See also

 List of American films of 2002
 Drumline
 Drummer
 HBCU
 Marching band
 Honda Battle of the Bands, the real-life inspiration for the Big Southern Classic in the film

References

External links
 
 
 
 
 

2002 films
2000s musical comedy-drama films
2002 romantic comedy-drama films
African-American musical films
2000s coming-of-age comedy-drama films
American coming-of-age comedy-drama films
American musical comedy-drama films
2000s teen comedy-drama films
American romantic comedy-drama films
American romantic musical films
American teen comedy-drama films
American teen romance films
Films set in Atlanta
2000s English-language films
Films shot in Georgia (U.S. state)
Films shot in New York City
Films directed by Charles Stone III
Films scored by John Powell
20th Century Fox films
2002 comedy films
Sports and historically black universities and colleges in the United States
2002 drama films
Films set in universities and colleges
2000s American films